Alloiococcus  is a genus of Gram-positive and nonmotile bacteria from the family of Carnobacteriaceae. Only one species of this genus is known (Alloiococcus otitis).

References

Further reading 
 
 

Lactobacillales
Monotypic bacteria genera
Bacteria genera